Edward W. Pugh (born July 9, 1949) is an American former politician and attorney from Kansas who served as a member of both the Kansas House of Representatives and the Kansas Senate.

Born in Wamego, Kansas, Pugh first entered politics in the mid-1990s, winning a seat in the Kansas House in the 1994 midterm elections and taking office in 1995. He won re-election in 1996, but did not finish his term; instead, he was appointed to the Kansas Senate to finish the term of Don Sallee, who resigned his seat. Pugh won re-election in his own right in 2000, and served in the Senate until 2004.

References

Republican Party Kansas state senators
Republican Party members of the Kansas House of Representatives
People from Wamego, Kansas
20th-century American politicians
21st-century American politicians
1949 births
Living people